Krive riječi is the debut studio album by Bosnian pop-ballad singer Maya Sar. It was released 1 June 2013 through Hayat Production in Bosnia and Herzegovina, Aquarius Records in Croatia, and City Records in Montenegro and Serbia. Wrong Words came a year after Sar competed in the Eurovision Song Contest 2012 with the song "Korake ti znam".

Background
Sar worked on the album for four years, recording in ten different studios in and around Bosnia. The entire album was mainly produced by Sar's husband Mahir Sarihodžić with assistant producer Filip Vidović.

Singles
The title song was released as the lead single on 7 September 2012.

Track listing
All songs were written solely by Maya Sar herself.

References

2013 debut albums
Maya Sar albums
Hayat Production albums
City Records albums